Child genius could refer to:

Child prodigy, a person under the age of ten who produces meaningful output in some domain to the level of an adult expert performer

Entertainment
Child Genius (Australian TV series) an Australian reality competition series produced by Warner Bros based on the UK TV series
Child Genius (British TV series), a British reality competition series produced by Wall to Wall Media
Child Genius (American TV series), an American reality competition series produced by Shed Media based on the UK TV series